Moomins on the Riviera (Finnish title: Muumit Rivieralla) is a 2014 Finnish-French animated family comedy film directed by Xavier Picard and produced by Hanna Hemilä, who is also co-director. The film is based on Moomin comic strips by Tove Jansson and Lars Jansson.

The film is a co-production of Finnish Handle Productions, French Pictak Cie and Chinese Sandman Animation Studio. Written by Leslie Stewart, Annina Enckell, Hanna Hemilä, Xavier Picard and Beata Harju, the English version of the film stars Russell Tovey as Moomin, Nathaniel Parker as Moominpappa and Tracy Ann Oberman as Moominmamma. The film is based on the Moomin Tove Jansson's original comic strip: Moomin on the Riviera and it is the first animated feature based on the comic strips.

In the film, the Moomins along with Snorkmaiden and Little My sail for the Riviera, where their unity is threatened. Snorkmaiden is dazzled by the attentions of the playboy Clark Tresco and Moominpappa befriends an aristocrat called Marquis Mongaga, while Moomin and Moominmamma decide to move to the beach in order to escape all the glamorous extravagance. Moomins on the Riviera was  released theatrically on 10 October 2014 in Finland to celebrate the 100th anniversary of Tove Jansson's birth. In the United Kingdom, the film made its premiere on 11 October 2014 at BFI London Film Festival and it had a wider theatrical release on 22 May 2015.

Plot
At night, while the Moomin family and residents of Moominvalley enjoy a party around a bonfire atop a cliffside, a pirate ship mistaking the blaze for a lighthouse crash into rocks at sea, forcing the crew to abandon ship and their hostages, Mymble and Little My.

The next morning, Moomin is stuck between deciding to help Moominmamma with washing, going fishing with Snufkin and acting out a scene with Snorkmaiden, wishing he knew how to say no to others. While acting out the scene, Moomin spots Mymble struggling to swim ashore and dives into the ocean to save her from drowning. Spotting the shipwreck, the Moomins decide to go and salvage what they can, taking a mirror, books, a chest of tropical seeds and several crates of fireworks, but leaving the chest of gold. Little My (who stayed in the ship's crows nest) eventually follows the family home from the ship on the back of a shark. The pirates follow the family back to Moominhouse upon spotting them with their cargo, but leave after discovering their gold is still on the ship, which has begun to sink.

At night, Snorkmaiden suggests going to the Riviera after reading a magazine with her idol, Audrey Glamour. The Moomins, Snorkmaiden and Little My set sail, but get lost in a storm and wind up on a deserted island. A box floats ashore containing thousands of bugs uttering insults and bad language, which the group gathers into a bag to take with them. At night, Snorkmaiden notices the lights of the Riviera not too far away from their location, and the family arrive on the shores the next morning.

While exploring the town, the family arrive at The Grand, the Riviera's resort hotel. Moominpappa introduces the family as "DeMoomin of Moominvalley", and are offered the Royal Suite to stay in. The family struggles to fit in among the affluent residents, however Moominpappa soon becomes friends with Marquis Mongaga, an artist who admires his bohemian eccentricity, and Snorkmaiden begins to spend her time with Audrey Glamour, and playboy Clark Tresco, much to Moomin's displeasure. Moomin and Moominmamma, both feeling that they don't fit into the rich lifestyle, decide to go and live under their boat on the beach.

Mongaga invites Moominpappa to his mansion where he shows him his art, consisting of walking elephant sculptures, and admits to him that he would gladly give up his rich lifestyle to live a bohemian lifestyle like Moominpappa. After pushing the statue of the town governor into the river and replacing it with one of the elephant statues, Mongaga comes to temporarily live with the Moomin family at the beach, where he carves more of his sculptures, and inspires Moomin to create a sculpture of his own. After sleeping rough and being attacked by a resident's dogs, Mongaga decides to depart back to his home, thanking the Moomins' for their hospitality and leaving his statues as a parting gift.

Moomin, fed up with seeing Clark with Snorkmaiden, challenges him to a duel for Snorkmaiden's love the next morning.  While not adept with the sword, Moomin ultimately triumphs after bashing Clark on the head with the hilt. The directors of the hotel decide to evict the Moomin family as their eccentricity has made the reputation of the hotel suffer. Ordered to pay for their stay with a hefty bill, the family try to pay with Mongaga's elephant statues, which are deemed worthless because so many of them exist. Snork Maiden decides to use her stashed casino winnings in order to pay their bill. Her money greatly exceeds the amount of the bill, but she allows the hotel to keep the money. That evening, Snorkmaiden finds Moomin's statue, a sculpture of her as a mermaid, and the two embrace.

Moominpappa decides to give homes to Mongaga's elephant statues, and Moominmamma opens her tropical rock garden to the public. Upon arriving at the town hall with a statue, the Mayor realises that Moominpappa was responsible for pushing the Governor's statue into the river and orders his arrest. After being chased through the town by the police, Moominpappa and the rest of the family quickly set sail. Moominmamma releases the bugs from the bag to halt the officers, which quickly swarm over the town with a plague of insults and bad language, causing fights among the residents.

The Moomin family get caught in a storm on their way back to Moominvalley, and decide to jettison some of their pots of tropical plants to lighten the load, inadvertently including Moomin's statue. Lost in the fog, with the plants still on board having overgrown into full trees, the family are eventually found and brought back to land by Snufkin. The family go back to their peaceful lives in Moominvalley, and Moomin and Snorkmaiden embrace on the cliffside while flying kites with Mymble and Little My.

Cast

The Finnish and Swedish dubs of the film were both cast with the same actors.

Additional roles from the English version of the film are played by Dominic Frisby, who also co-directed the English dialogue, Ian Conningham, Alison O’Donnell, Bernard Alane, Bruno Magnes, Andy Turvey, Kris Gummerus, Glyn Welden Banks, Lee Willis, Sanna-June Hyde, Christopher Sloan and Leslie Hyde. Maria Sid and Beata Harju, who provide voices for Moominmamma and the Mymble in the Finnish and Swedish version, also voice minor roles in the English version.

Production
According to Sophia Jansson of the Moomin Characters, the company had been careful with giving the rights to new film adaptions about the Moomins for years. When the participation rights with the Telescreen expired, Sophia Jansson became interested in the idea of animated film based on the Moomin comic strip story. Producer Hanna Hemilä, who is Sophia's close friend, told Sophia about French animation director Xavier Picard, who was interested to adapt comic strips to the big screen. They contacted Picard and the film started production in France in 2010. The film is animated traditionally, hand drawn animation with a reduced color scale for the backgrounds in order to maintain continuity with the black-and-white comic strips. Pictak Cie worked on developing the visuals of the film. Chinese Sandman Animation Studio did 120,000 drawings for animation and Handle Productions produced the film. The film marks the feature film directorial debut of Xavier Picard. Picard was not aware of the Moomin characters before he discovered them 20 years ago in Japan, but he has been particularly fascinated by comic strips and has stated to want translate the art of Tove Jansson into animation. The Finnish voice cast of the film was confirmed in August 2014 featuring Maria Sid as Moominmamma, while the English voice cast was confirmed in a September 2014 press announcement. The film's score was composed by many Finnish and French composers, including Jean de Aguiar, Panu Aaltio, Timo Lassy, Milla Viljamaa and Anna-Karin Korhonen. The film stays faithful to Tove Jansson's original story in the original comic strip, with the addition of a few characters and story lines: Little My and Snufkin, have been added to the film, in addition to some other characters from the Moomin comic strip. While the production crew felt that the Riviera is fun and dramatic setting, they have also add a side story at the beginning of the film, that takes place in Moominvalley, and where Moomins got their idea for the sea voyage. The reason for this was to introduce the dwelling place of the Moomins for the international audience. Sophia Jansson herself approved the change.

Release
Moomins on the Riviera was released on 10 October 2014 in Finland to celebrate the 100th anniversary of Tove Jansson’s birth, and on 31 October 2014 in Sweden. In France, the film was released on 4 February 2015. Indie Sales acquired the release rights for the Toronto International Film Festival and in addition, the film was sold to other countries, including Switzerland and Japan. For the UK theatrical release, the film made its premiere on 11 October 2014 at the BFI London Film Festival. The film had a wider theatrical release in UK for 22 May 2015 that was distributed by Vertigo Films. In February 2015, the film was confirmed to be featured on New York International Children's Film Festival.

A Region 2 home video edition of Moomins on the Riviera was released on February 11, 2015 on DVD and Blu-ray in Finland. The film was released on DVD on September 28, 2015, in United Kingdom.

Reception

Critical response
From BFI London Film Festival screening, Matt Micucci of CineCola praised the film's screenplay and soundtrack, while calling "a smart and surprisingly quick witted film as well as the perfect tribute to a celebrated and much loved comic strip that has the potential of winning it an even greater and more international audience". Sara Steensig of gbtimes was enthusiastic towards the film despite pointing out of Moominpappa's painful hangover and Moomintroll's bitter jealousy, but she notes after that "These are phenomena that adults will recognize but most children will not, and they are shown in a way that will not make young kids wonder about things they are not ready for."

Box office
As of October 26, 2014, Moomins on the Riviera grossed $1,381,862 in Finland. The film first earned $337,391 (28,500 viewers) on its first weekend, surpassing The Grump, and became the highest-grossing film during its first two weekends in Finland.

Accolades

Cancelled TV series
In an October 2014 blog article at Screendaily, Sophia Jansson stated that the film's "artistic team has made an effort to be true to the original drawings and the original text", and it is hinted that Jansson is now in discussions with various parties for a new, similarly animated television series. This has led to the 2019 television series Moominvalley, a CGI-animated show which looks nothing like this film.

References

External links

 
 Handle Productions' page
 
 
 

2014 films
2014 comedy films
2010s French animated films
2014 animated films
2010s avant-garde and experimental films
Animated films based on comics
Films about cities
Films about trolls
Films based on comic strips
Films set on the French Riviera
Finnish avant-garde and experimental films
Finnish comedy films
French avant-garde and experimental films
French comedy films
French children's films
Finnish children's films
Moomins
Vertigo Films films
Vertigo Films animated films
Lionsgate films
Lionsgate animated films
Films scored by Panu Aaltio
2010s English-language films